The America Zone was one of the three regional zones of the 1962 Davis Cup.

5 teams entered the America Zone, with the winner going on to compete in the Inter-Zonal Zone against the winners of the Eastern Zone and Europe Zone. Mexico defeated Yugoslavia in the final and progressed to the Inter-Zonal Zone.

Draw

Quarterfinals

United States vs. Canada

Semifinals

Mexico vs. United States

Caribbean/West Indies vs. Yugoslavia

Final

Mexico vs. Yugoslavia

References

External links
Davis Cup official website

Davis Cup Americas Zone
America Zone
Davis Cup